The 194th Ohio Infantry Regiment, sometimes 194th Ohio Volunteer Infantry (or 194th OVI) was an infantry regiment in the Union Army during the American Civil War.

Service
The 194th Ohio Infantry was organized at Camp Chase in Columbus, Ohio, and mustered in for one year service under the command of Colonel Anson George McCook.

The regiment left Ohio for Charleston, West Virginia, March 14. It was assigned to General Egan's Provisional Division, Army of the Shenandoah. Participated in operations in the Shenandoah Valley until April, then ordered to Washington, D.C. for garrison duty until October.

The 194th Ohio Infantry mustered out of service October 24, 1865, at Washington, D.C..

Casualties
The regiment lost a total of 38 enlisted men during service, all due to disease.

Commanders
 Colonel Anson George McCook

Notable members
 Colonel Anson George McCook - U.S. Senator from New York, 1877-1883

See also

 List of Ohio Civil War units
 Ohio in the Civil War

References
 Dyer, Frederick H. A Compendium of the War of the Rebellion (Des Moines, IA:  Dyer Pub. Co.), 1908.
 Ohio Roster Commission. Official Roster of the Soldiers of the State of Ohio in the War on the Rebellion, 1861–1865, Compiled Under the Direction of the Roster Commission (Akron, OH: Werner Co.), 1886–1895.
 Reid, Whitelaw. Ohio in the War: Her Statesmen, Her Generals, and Soldiers (Cincinnati, OH: Moore, Wilstach, & Baldwin), 1868. 
Attribution

External links
 Ohio in the Civil War: 194th Ohio Volunteer Infantry by Larry Stevens
 National flag of the 194th Ohio Infantry
 Regimental flag of the 194th Ohio Infantry
 Guidon of the 194th Ohio Infantry

Military units and formations established in 1865
Military units and formations disestablished in 1865
Units and formations of the Union Army from Ohio
1865 establishments in Ohio